St. Anthony is a neighborhood of the city of New Orleans.  A subdistrict of the Gentilly District Area, its boundaries as defined by the City Planning Commission are: New York Street to the north, Elysian Fields Avenue to the east, Mirabeau Avenue to the south and the London Avenue Canal to the west.

The neighborhood is part of the Gentilly section of the city as well as the city's 7th Ward.

The area experienced disastrous flooding at the end of August 2005 from a levee failure on the London Avenue Canal during Hurricane Katrina.

Geography

Adjacent Neighborhoods
 Lake Terrace/Lake Oaks (north)
 Milneburg (east)
 Gentilly Terrace (east)
 Dillard (south)
 Filmore (west)

Boundaries
The City Planning Commission defines the boundaries of St. Anthony as these streets: New York Street, Elysian Fields Avenue, Mirabeau Avenue and the London Avenue Canal.

Demographics
As of the census of 2000, there were 5,318 people, 2,233 households, and 1,360 families residing in the neighborhood.  The population density was 8,441 /mi2 (3,324 /km2).

As of the census of 2010, there were 3,510 people, 1,430 households, and 868 families residing in the neighborhood.

See also
 New Orleans neighborhoods
 Gentilly, New Orleans

References

Neighborhoods in New Orleans